Stichtse Vecht is a municipality of the Netherlands and lies in the northwestern part of the province of Utrecht. 

The municipality has about 63,000 inhabitants and covers an area of about 107 km² (41 sq mi).

Stichtse Vecht has been newly formed by a merger of the municipalities of Breukelen (in the west), Maarssen (in the east) and Loenen (in the north) on 1 January 2011.

Geography 
Stichtse Vecht is situated north of the city of Utrecht, in an area called the Vechtstreek. It is near sea level and is mostly rural with many pastures. 

Within its boundaries lay the Maarsseveense Plassen, which are recreational lakes. Northeast it borders the Loosdrechtse Plassen, also recreational lakes, which lay in neighbouring municipality of Wijdemeren.

The Amsterdam–Rhine Canal and the river Vecht crosses the municipality from south to north.

Topography 

Dutch Topographic map of Stichtse Vecht, June 2015

History 
The municipality contains many stately homes (buitenplaatsen) and several castles, like Nijenrode Castle, Slot Zuylen and Huis te Mijnden.

Transportation 
The A2 motorway crosses the municipality from south to north.

There are two railway stations:
 Breukelen railway station
 Maarssen railway station

Population centers 

Former municipality of Breukelen:
 Breukelen
 Gieltjesdorp
 Kockengen
 Kortrijk
 Laagnieuwkoop
 Nieuwer-Ter-Aa
 Noordeinde
 Oud-Aa
 Oukoop
 Portengen
 Portengense Brug
 Scheendijk
 Spengen
 Zuideinde

Former municipality of Loenen:
 Loenen (aan de Vecht)
 Loenersloot
 Mijnden
 Nieuwerhoek
 Nieuwersluis
 Nigtevecht
 Vreeland

Former municipality of Maarssen:
 Maarssen
 Maarssenbroek
 Maarsseveen
 Molenpolder
 Oud-Maarsseveen
 Oud-Zuilen
 Tienhoven

Politics

Municipal council 
The municipal council consists of the following parties:

Executive board 
VVD, CDA, D66, ChristenUnie-SGP, Streekbelangen and Het Vechtse Verbond have formed a coalition. Together they have 22 seats. Members of the executive board are:

Mayor:
 Marc Witteman (CDA)

Aldermen:
 Pieter de Groene (D66) 
 Gera Helling-Zeisseink (CDA) 
 Vital van der Horst (Streekbelangen) 
 Piet Ploeg (VVD)
 Jaap Verkroost (CDA) 
 Klaas Wiersema (VVD)

Notable people

The Arts 
 Willem Vrelant (?? in Vreeland - ca.1481) a Dutch book illuminator
 Constantijn à Renesse (1626 in Maarssen – 1680) a Dutch Golden Age painter 
 Gerrit Zegelaar (1719 in Loenen aan de Vecht – 1794) a Dutch painter
 Isabelle de Charrière (1740 in Castle Zuylen – 1805) a Dutch writer of letters, novels, pamphlets, music and plays
 Nicolaas Bastert (1854 in Maarssen – 1939) a Dutch landscape painter
 Marjolein Bastin (born 1943 in Loenen aan de Vecht) a Dutch nature artist, writer, children's author and illustrator
 Rutger Hauer (1944 in Breukelen – 2019) a Dutch actor, writer and environmentalist 
 Penney de Jager (born 1948) dancer and choreographer, lives in Stichtse Vecht
 Leoni Jansen (1955 in Leiden) a Dutch singer, stage-director and TV anchor-woman

Public thinking & Public Service 
 Gerrit van Arkel (1858 in Loenen aan de Vecht – 1918) a Dutch Jugendstil (Art Nouveau) architect 
 Aarnoud van Heemstra (1871 in Vreeland – 1957) a Dutch nobleman, jurist and politician. 
 Pieter Nicolaas van Eyck (1887 in Breukelen - 1954) a foreign correspondent, poet, critic, essayist and philosopher
 Pierre Joseph Eyma (1903 in Maarssen – 1945) a Dutch botanist
 Annelien Kappeyne van de Coppello (1936 in Loenen aan de Vecht – 1990) a Dutch politician
 Sander Griffioen (born 1941 in Loenen aan de Vecht) a Dutch philosopher and academic
 Bernt Schneiders (born 1959 in Breukelen) a Dutch politician, Mayor of Landsmeer, Heemskerk & Haarlem
 Liesbeth Spies (born 1966 in Alphen aan den Rijn) a Dutch politician, Mayor of Alphen aan den Rijn
 Marianne Thieme (born 1972 in Ede) a Dutch politician, author, animal rights activist and jurist

Sport 

 Cor Aalten (1913 in Breukelen-Nijenrode – 1991) a Dutch athlete, competed at the 1932 Summer Olympics
 Henk van der Grift (born 1935 in Breukelen) a retired Dutch speed skater, competed at the 1960 Winter Olympics
 Bart Verschoor (born 1965 in Loenersloot) a sailor, competed at the 1988 Summer Olympics
 Annemieke Kiesel (born 1979 in Kockengen) a former Dutch footballer and coach, also played for the Dutch national team, retiring with 156 caps

References

External links

 Official website

 
Municipalities of Utrecht (province)
Municipalities of the Netherlands established in 2011